Ree Morton (August 3, 1936 – April 30, 1977) was an American visual artist who was closely associated with the postminimalist and feminist art movements of the 1970s.

Life and career
Ree Morton was born on August 3, 1936, in Ossining, New York. A mother of three and the former wife of a navy officer, Morton lived a relatively nomadic life and began her artistic practice as a hobby through drawing. She decided to become a full-time artist in the late 1960s, receiving a BFA from the University of Rhode Island in 1968 and an MFA from the Tyler School of Art at Temple University in 1970.

Morton worked in a variety of mediums including sculpture, drawing and installation. Morton deployed "confrontational innocence," as described by art historian Lucy Lippard, and humor in her sculptures that referenced everyday decorative forms such as curtains, ruffles and swags. Morton self-described her work as "light and ironic on serious subjects without frivolity." Her piece Bake Sale (1974), for instance, was spurred on by a male faculty member at the Philadelphia College of Art who suggested that women on the faculty should stick to bake sales. Formally, Bake Sale (which features a comically low table covered with cakes and pastries against a wall of Celastic bows) typifies the playful interrelationships of objects Morton sought to create in her work.

Curator Marcia Tucker describes Morton's work as "unusual in its totality; it incorporates painting, sculpture, real and crafted objects, natural and artificial materials. The work is intelligent without being intellectual, narrative without being literary and ironic without being whimsical. Its multiplicity, contradictory and slightly perverse nature, its response to natural forms and its sources in primitive human phenomena result in a unique sculptural mode." Morton's art frequently combined an interest in poetry, language, and semiotics.

Though she mostly received attention for her sculptural work during her lifetime, Morton continued to draw, write and sketch throughout her career. Morton died at the age of 40 in a car accident in Chicago, Illinois on April 30, 1977.

Public works

Artpark residency
From July 21 to August 17, 1976, Ree Morton participated in the residency program at Artpark in Lewiston, New York. Her work there was created around the natural beauty and the history of the site involving both painting and landscape. She developed two works during the residency, Regarding Landscape, and The Maid of the Mist.

In Regarding Landscape, Morton utilized a pre-existing wall in front of a waterfall along the Upper Gorge Trail. There she started by decorating the wall with arches, drapery, roses, and streamers. In her statement in the Artpark Visual Arts Program catalog, Morton specified that her intention was, “to increase the theatrical, dramatic quality already present at the site; to make the location as much like a diorama as possible.” The second part of this piece was to glue paintings of various shots of the landscape onto surrounding rocks, bordered by a colorful frame. The idea for this was for the paintings to be juxtaposed to the actual landscape that it references.

For Maid of the Mist, Morton painted a thirty-five-foot ladder yellow and decorated it with Celastic ribbons and roses and incorporated two life preservers decorated with flowers and streamers into the event as well. The ladder was placed on the hill, going into the water, with one life preserver in the water tied to the shore and another tied to Morton's waist. She cut the rope connecting the life preserver floating in the water and released it into the current. This piece directly references the legend of the Maid of the Mist, where a maiden was sent over the falls as a bride to the Niagara river. Morton refers to The Maid of the Mist as both a “symbolic rescue” and a “memorial event”.

Something in the Wind 
Developed in 1974, Something in the Wind was an installation of over one hundred flags on the schooner Lettie G. Howard at the South Street Seaport Museum in New York. Each hand-sewn flag featured the first name of someone close to Morton, from her children to artists such as Barbara Kruger, Rosemary Mayer, Italo Scanga, and Laurie Anderson, along with an associated drawing. Originally conceived as an installation for Rockefeller Center, the piece was intended to bring private life and relationships into public space.

Reception and early exhibition history 

Ree Morton's work has been revered by artists, critics and curators since 1973 when her Souvenir Piece was the inaugural exhibition at Artists Space (selected by Nancy Graves) in 1973. In December, Artforum published Lucy Lippard's essay Ree Morton: At the Still Point of the Turning World (reprinted in Lippard's seminal 1976 book From the Center). Morton had a solo exhibition in the lobby gallery of the Whitney Museum of American Art in 1974.

Legacy and posthumous exhibition history
Following her untimely death, in 1980 the New Museum in New York City presented Ree Morton: Retrospective 1971-1977, organized by Alan Schwartzman and Kathleen Thomas.  The exhibition traveled to the Renaissance Society at the University of Chicago, Albright-Knox Art Gallery (Buffalo, NY), University of Colorado Museum (Boulder), and to the Contemporary Arts Museum Houston. In 2000, the Robert Hull Fleming Museum at the University of Vermont hosted an exhibition titled The Mating Habits of Lines: Sketchbooks and Notebooks of Red Morton, curated by Morton's friend, the artist Barbara Zucker. The exhibition also traveled to the Rosenwald Wolf Gallery at the University of the Arts in Philadelphia Pennsylvania.

Morton enjoyed a successful artistic career during her lifetime, and has often been cited as an inspiration by a diverse group of artists including Lari Pittman, Jeanne Silverthorne and more recently, Alex DaCorte. In 2007, Marc Foxx Gallery in Los Angeles, organized For Ree which included the work of Jim Hodges, Evan Holloway, Susan Philipsz, Amada Ross-Ho and Frances Stark, alongside works by Morton.

Between 2008 and 2015, three solo museum exhibitions on Morton were organized. An extensive exhibition of her work was displayed at the Generali Foundation in Vienna, Austria in 2008; an exhibition of her works on paper and related sculpture was shown at Drawing Center in New York in 2009, titled At the Still Point of the Turning World after a T.S. Eliot quote that Morton kept above her desk; and in 2015, the Museo Nacional Centro de Arte Reina Sofía presented a retrospective of Morton's work called Ree Morton: Be a Place, Place an Image, Imagine a Poem. In 2018 the Institute of Contemporary Art, Philadelphia will hold the first major solo museum exhibition of Morton's work in the United States in over 35 years.

Selected exhibitions

Selected solo exhibitions
 2018: The Plant That Heals May Also Poison, Institute of Contemporary Art, University of Pennsylvania
 2016: Something in the Wind, Alexander and Bonin, New York
 2015: Be a Place, Place an Image, Imagine a Poem - Ree Morton: A retrospective, Museo Nacional Centro de Arte Reina Sofía, Madrid
2009: At the Still Point of the Turning World, The Drawing Center, New York
 2008-2009: The Deities Must be Made to Laugh. Works 1971-1977, Generali Foundation, Vienna
 1999-2002: The Mating Habits of Lines: Sketchbooks and Notebooks of Ree Morton, Fleming Museum of Art, University of Vermont, Burlington; The University of the Arts, Philadelphia; Art in General, New York
 1998: Celastic works and Drawings: 1974-77, Alexander and Bonin, New York
 1997: Ree Morton (1936-1977), Annemarie Verna Galerie, Zürich
1993: Works from 1971-1974, Brooke Alexander, New York
 1985: Manipulations of the Organic, Solomon R. Guggenheim Museum, New York
 1982: Ree Morton. Selected Works: 1974-1976, Max Protetch Gallery, New York
 1980-1981: Ree Morton: Retrospective 1971-1977, The New Museum, New York; Contemporary Arts Museum, Houston; University of Colorado Museum, Boulder; Albright-Knox Gallery, Buffalo, NY; Renaissance Society at the University of Chicago
 1977: Ree Morton 1936-1977, Grey Art Gallery, New York University
1977: Droll/Kolbert Gallery, New York
 1976: Regional Pieces, Bykert Gallery, New York
 1974: To Each Concrete Man, Whitney Museum of American Art, New York
 1973: Souvenir Piece, Artists Space, New York

Selected group exhibitions

 2020-2021: Don't Let This Be Easy, Walker Art Center, Minneapolis, MN
 2016: Drawing Dialogues: Selections from the Sol LeWitt Collection, The Drawing Center, New York
 2012-2013: Once Removed: Sculpture’s Changing Frame of Reference, Yale University Art Gallery, New Haven
 2010-2011: Singular Visions, Whitney Museum of American Art, New York
 2007-2009: WACK! Art and the Feminist Revolution, Museum of Contemporary Art, Los Angeles; National Museum of Women in the Arts, Washington, DC; MoMA PS1, New York; Vancouver Art Gallery
 2005: Looking at Words: The Formal Presence of Text in Modern and Contemporary Works of Art, Andrea Rosen Gallery, New York
 1995: In a Different Light, Berkeley Art Museum, Berkeley, CA
 1990-1991: Word as Image: American Art, 1960–1990, Milwaukee Art Museum; Oklahoma City Museum of Art; The Contemporary Arts Museum, Houston
 1984: Content: A Contemporary Focus 1974-1984, Hirshhorn Museum and Sculpture Garden, Washington, DC
 1979-1980: The 1970s: New American Painting, The New Museum, New York; National Museum, Belgrade; National Museum, Zagreb; Moderna Galerija, Ljubljana; Fiera della Sardegna, Cagliari, Sardinia; Civica Galleria d'Arte Moderna, Palermo, Sicily; North Jutland Museum, Copenhagen; Geodesic Dome in Nepliget Park, Budapest; Geodesic, Dome in Parcul Herastan Park, Bucharest; BWA Gallery, Torun, Poland; Ministry of Culture, Łódź, Poland; National Museum, Warsaw
 1978: Matrix/Berkeley 2, Berkeley Art Museum, Berkeley, CA
 1976: Contemporary Women: Consciousness and Content, Brooklyn Museum
 1976: Improbable Furniture, Institute of Contemporary Art, University of Pennsylvania; La Jolla Museum of Contemporary Art, CA; Museum of Contemporary Art, Chicago
 1975: Personal Concern, Material Support, Institute of Contemporary Art, Boston
 1973: Biennial Exhibition of Contemporary American Painting and Sculpture, Whitney Museum of American Art, New York

Selected collections
 Berkeley Art Museum and Pacific Film Archive, CA
 Institute of Contemporary Art, Boston
 Albright-Knox Art Gallery, Buffalo
Harvard University Art Museums, Cambridge, MA
Art Institute of Chicago
 Museum of Contemporary Art, Chicago
Los Angeles County Museum of Art
 Museum of Contemporary Art, Los Angeles
 Museo Nacional Centro de Arte Reina Sofía, Madrid
Museum of Contemporary Art, North Miami
Walker Art Center, Minneapolis
 Yale University Art Gallery, New Haven
 Brooklyn Museum, New York
Museum of Modern Art, New York
 Solomon R. Guggenheim Museum, New York
 Whitney Museum of American Art, New York
Allen Memorial Art Museum, Oberlin, OH
Pennsylvania Academy of the Fine Arts, Philadelphia
Philadelphia Museum of Art
 Museu de Arte Contemporânea, Fundação Serralves, Porto
Rhode Island School of Design Museum
 Generali Foundation, Vienna
National Gallery of Art, Washington DC

Selected bibliography
 Folie, Sabine and Lafer, Ilse, eds., with texts by Ammer, Manuela, Folie, Sabine, Lafer, Ilse, and Ribas, João. Ree Morton: Be a Place, Place an Image, Imagine a Poem, ex. cat. Madrid: Museo Nacional Centro de Arte Reina Sofía, 2015 
 Ribas, João, ed., with texts by Butler, Cornelia H., Schwartzman, Allan and Lippard, Lucy R. At the Still Point of the Turning World, ex. cat. The Drawing Center, New York, 2009 
 Folie, Sabine, ed., with texts by Baldon, Diana, Folie, Sabine, Molesworth, Helen, and Neubauer, Susanne. Ree Morton: Works 1971–1977, ex. cat. Vienna: Generali Foundation, 2009 
 Cohen, Janie, Schwartzman, Allan and Zucker, Barbara. The Mating Habits of Lines: Sketchbooks and Notebooks of Ree Morton, ex. cat. Burlington, VT: Robert Hull Fleming Museum, University of Vermont, 2000 
 Schwartzman, Allan, and Thomas, Kathleen. Ree Morton – Retrospective 1971 – 1977, ex. cat. New York: The New Museum, 1980
 Morton, Ree. “Analects” in Sondheim, Alan, ed. Individuals: Post-Movement Art in America. New York: E.F. Dutton, 226–245, 1977

References

1936 births
1977 deaths
20th-century American sculptors
American women sculptors
Temple University alumni
Road incident deaths in Illinois
20th-century American women artists
Feminist artists
People from Ossining, New York
Sculptors from New York (state)
University of Rhode Island alumni
University of the Arts (Philadelphia) faculty
Temple University Tyler School of Art alumni
American women academics